The Görlitz tramway network is a network of tramways forming part of the public transport system in Görlitz, a city in the federal state of Saxony, Germany.

Opened in 1882, the network has been operated since 1996 by the Verkehrsgesellschaft Görlitz (VGG), since 2019 by the Görlitzer Verkehrsbetriebe, and is integrated in the Verkehrsverbund Oberlausitz-Niederschlesien (ZVON).

Lines 
, the network had the following lines:

Rolling stock
The current fleet consists of 14 KT4D trams built from 1979 until 1990. The procurement of new trams is in preparation.

See also
List of town tramway systems in Germany
Trams in Germany

References

Notes

Bibliography

External links

 
 

Görlitz
Gorlitz
Transport in Saxony
Metre gauge railways in Germany
Görlitz